Cerizy is a commune in the Aisne department in Hauts-de-France in northern France. It is part of the Canton of Ribemont.

During the Retreat from Mons on 28 August 1914, the British 12th Lancers charged a dismounted Prussian Guard Dragoon regiment near the village.

Population

See also
Communes of the Aisne departmentthe artist

References

Communes of Aisne
Aisne communes articles needing translation from French Wikipedia